Pelegrina aeneola (sometimes referred to as “Coppered White-cheeked Jumping Spider”) is a species of jumping spider in the family Salticidae. It is found in North America. Not much is known about this species.

Description

Coloring
Females are mostly white with brown on the top of their abdomen, black on their forehead and some brown markings on their legs.  Males on the other hand have black legs and pedipalps, a dark brown carapace, a lighter brown abdomen and white markings on their pedipalps legs and abdomen.

Size
Like all Jumping Spiders Pelegrina aeneola is sexually dimorphic. Females are 5.5 millimeters while the slightly smaller males are 5 millimeters long.

Distribution
Pelegrina aeneola are found in diverse vegetations throughout western North America.

Diet
Pelegrina aeneola has been seen eating insect eggs.

Gallery

Related species
 Pelegrina proterva
 Pelegrina galathea
 Pelegrina tillandsiae
 Pelegrina insignis
 Pelegrina flavipes
 Pelegrina exigua

References

Further reading

External links

 

Salticidae
Articles created by Qbugbot
Spiders described in 1892

Currently not much is known about this species. If more information comes up please feel free to add it.